Benjamin S. Abella is an American physician, emergency medicine practitioner, internist, academic and researcher. He is a Professor and Vice Chair of Research at University of Pennsylvania’s Department of Emergency Medicine. He directs the Center for Resuscitation Science and the Penn Acute Research Collaboration at the University. He has participated in developing international CPR guidelines.

Abella has published over 200 scholarly papers regarding cardiac arrest, myocardial perfusion, therapeutic hypothermia, CPR delivery and resuscitation. He is a fellow of European Resuscitation Council.

Early life and education 
Abella was born and raised in Hyde Park, Chicago. His father, Isaac Abella, was a physics professor at the University of Chicago, and his mother, Mary Ann Abella, was a professor of Art at Chicago State University. He has one sibling, a sister Sarah Abella. In high school, Abella showed aptitude for science, placing 3rd nationally in the Westinghouse Science Talent Search.

Abella completed his B.A. in Biochemistry from Washington University in St. Louis in 1992. He completed his M.Phil. in Genetics from the University of Cambridge in the following year. In 1998, Abella received his MD degree from Johns Hopkins School of Medicine.

Career 
Abella joined University of Pennsylvania's Department of Emergency Medicine as an Assistant Professor in the early 2000s. In 2013, he was promoted to Associate Professor and to Professor in 2017. Along with academic appointments, he has also been involved with administrative responsibilities. From 2007 to 2017, he co-chaired the Hospital Clinical Emergencies Committee and was appointed as Vice Chair of Research at the Department of Emergency Medicine during this tenure. In 2016, he was appointed as Director of Center for Resuscitation Science and of Penn Acute Research Collaboration.

Abella chaired the Council on Cardiopulmonary, Critical Care and Resuscitation for the American Heart Association from 2015 till 2017, and serves as the Co-Chair of the American Heart Association Resuscitation Science Symposium. He also served on the Obama campaign Medical Advisory Board.

Abella has discussed cardiac arrest and his research work on Good Morning America, National Geographic, and other national media sources. He worked with Sanjay Gupta on the CNN documentary Cheating Death and is featured in Gupta's book of the same title.

Research
Abella has conducted research on sudden cardiac arrest, myocardial perfusion and targeted temperature management. He has also worked on evaluation of CPR and resuscitation performance, testing of new teaching methods of CPR, assessment of neurologic outcomes after cardiac arrest and methods to improve the application of therapeutic hypothermia. He is the developer of a training course for post-arrest care and targeted temperature management, known as the Penn TTM Academy.

Targeted temperature management  (TTM) 
Abella studied the practical implementation of TTM after cardiac arrest and presented a detailed management plan for the addition of TTM for in the care of out of hospital cardiac arrest survivors. He developed an important animal model to study post-arrest TTM. He was one of the first to establish that intra-arrest TTM could dramatically improve arrest outcomes, which has subsequently sparked clinical trials to study the same concept.

CPR delivery and resuscitation performance
Abella research in this area indicated an improved CPR quality through a combination of a training procedure (termed “RAPID” post arrest training) along with real-time audiovisual feedback. This combined procedure also led to a greater rate of return of spontaneous circulation. In early 2010s, Abella published an article about the importance of cardiopulmonary resuscitation quality and presented several practical approaches such as using real-time CPR sensing, physiologic monitoring and metronome prompting in order to improve the CPR performance.

Awards and honors 
2004 - Academic Excellence Award, Emergency Medicine Residents Association
2007 - Operational Quality Award for Post-Cardiac Arrest Resuscitation and Hypothermia, Hospital of the University of Pennsylvania
2008 - Health Breakthrough Award, Ladies Home Journal magazine
2011 - Fabien Vickrey MD Memorial Award in Emergency Medicine, York Hospital
2015 - William Montgomery, MD Excellence in Education Award
2017 - 3CPR Distinguished Service Award, American Heart Association
2018 - Practitioner of the Year Award, Philadelphia County Medical Society

Selected articles 
Abella BS, Alvarado JP, Myklebust H, Edelson DP, Barry A, O'Hearn N, Vanden Hoek TL, Becker LB. Quality of cardiopulmonary resuscitation during in-hospital cardiac arrest. JAMA. 2005; 293(3):305-10.
Edelson DP, Abella BS, Kramer-Johansen J, Wik L, Myklebust H, Barry AM, Merchant RM, Vanden Hoek TL, Steen PA, Becker LB. Effects of compression depth and pre-shock pauses predict defibrillation failure during cardiac arrest. Resuscitation 2006; 71(2):137-45.
Meaney PA, Bobrow BJ, Mancini ME, Christenson J, de Caen AR, Bhanji F, Abella BS, Kleinman ME, Edelson DP, Berg RA, Aufderheide TP, Menon V, Leary M; CPR Quality Summit Investigators, the American Heart Association Emergency Cardiovascular Care Committee, and the Council on Cardiopulmonary, Critical Care, Perioperative and Resuscitation. Cardiopulmonary resuscitation quality: [corrected] improving cardiac resuscitation outcomes both inside and outside the hospital: a consensus statement from the American Heart Association. Circulation. 2013;128(4):417-35.
Heldman AW, Cheng L, Jenkins GM, Heller PF, Kim DW, Ware M Jr, Nater C, Hruban RH, Rezai B, Abella BS, Bunge KE, Kinsella JL, Sollott SJ, Lakatta EG, Brinker JA, Hunter WL, Froehlich JP. Paclitaxel stent coating inhibits neointimal hyperplasia at 4 weeks in a porcine model of coronary restenosis. Circulation. 2001; 103(18):2289-95.
Abella BS, Zhao D, Alvarado J, Vanden Hoek TL, Becker LB. Intra-arrest cooling improves outcomes in a murine cardiac arrest model. Circulation. 2004; 109(22):2786-91.

References 

American physicians
Living people
Perelman School of Medicine at the University of Pennsylvania faculty
Alumni of the University of Cambridge
Year of birth missing (living people)
American expatriates in England
Washington University in St. Louis alumni
Johns Hopkins School of Medicine alumni